Anna Seghers-Preis is a literary prize of Germany. The prize goes back to the German writer Anna Seghers (1900–1983), who stated in her testament that the revenues from her work should be used to encourage promising young writers. The award is endowed with 25,000 euros, to be awarded in equal parts to an author from the German and the Latin American region. The prize has been awarded since 1986 by the Academy of Arts (Berlin) till 1994, later by the Anna Seghers Foundation. The board of the Anna Seghers Foundation appoints an annual personality as a juror, which suggests the two winners.

Winners

 1986: Ingeborg Arlt, Omar Saavedra Santis
 1987: Kerstin Hensel, Ramón Díaz Eterovic, Gioconda Belli
 1988: Kathrin Schmidt, Jens Sparschuh
 1989: Annett Gröschner, Jörg Kowalski
 1990: Arturo Arias, Daína Chaviano, Johannes Jansen, Reinhard Jirgl, Sonja Voß-Scharfenberg. 
 1991: Haus für Strassenkinder (Brazil)
 1992: Ines Eck
 1993: Alois Hotschnig
 1994: João Ubaldo Ribeiro
 1995: Marion Titze
 1996: Michael Kleeberg, Miguel Vitagliano
 1997: Ulrich Peltzer, Carmen Boullosa
 1998: Róža Domašcyna, David Mitrani Arenal
 1999: Stefanie Menzinger, Hermann Bellinghausen
 2000: Melanie Gieschen, Alonso Cueto
 2001: Ana Teresa Torres, Carsten Probst
 2002: Rafael Gumucio, Lutz Seiler
 2003: Catalin Dorian Florescu
 2004: Claudia Hernández, Jan Wagner
 2005: Cristina Rivera-Garza, Ulf Stolterfoht
 2006: Nico Bleutge, Pedro Lemebel
 2007: Fabián Casas, Katja Oskamp
 2008: Lukas Bärfuss, Alejandra Costamagna
 2009: Daniela Dröscher, Guadalupe Nettel
 2010: Félix Bruzzone, Andreas Schäfer
 2011: Sabrina Janesch, Lina Meruane (Chile)
 2012: Olga Grjasnowa, Wilmer Urrelo Zaráte
 2015: Nino Haratischwili
 2016: Yuri Herrera (Mexico)
 2017: Maren Kames
 2018: Julián Fuks, Manja Präkels
 2019: Fernanda Melchor, Joshua Groß
 2020: Ivna Žic, Hernán Ronsino
 2021: Francis Nenik, Magela Baudoin
 2022: Yael Inokai, Alia Trabucco Zeran

External links 
 Anna Seghers Foundation

German literary awards
Awards established in 1986
1986 establishments in Germany